Welcome to My World is the 7th album by Rosie Gaines, released on October 30, 2006.

Track listing
All tracks written by Rosie Gaines except where noted.
 "Welcome to My World" – 6:01
 "Just a Moment Away" – 4:52
 "Mamma Soul" – 4:44
 "Shafeek (I Love You)" – 5:23
 "Sun Moon '06" – 5:07
 "Number 1" – 3:53
 "Take a Chance" – 5:13
 "I Do" – 4:09
 "Sudden Moves" – 5:41
 "Sun Moon '06" (Reggae Mix) – 4:56
 "Closer Than Close" (MK Vocal Respray) – 6:38
 "Yesterday" – 5:58

Rosie Gaines albums
2006 albums